Isaiah Thornton Montgomery (May 21, 1847 – March 5, 1924) was founder of Mound Bayou, Mississippi, an all-black community. A Republican, he was a delegate to the 1890 Mississippi Constitutional Convention and served as mayor of Mound Bayou.

He participated in the 1890 Mississippi constitutional convention as a delegate from Bolivar County and voted for the adoption of a state constitution that effectively disfranchised black voters for decades, using poll taxes and literacy tests to raise barriers to voter registration. Montgomery promoted an accommodationist position for African Americans. The I. T. Montgomery House in Mound Bayou is a National Landmark.

Early life and education
Born into slavery, Isaiah was the son of Ben Montgomery, a slave whose owner, Joseph Davis, promoted him to overseer. The younger Montgomery learned to read and write due to his father's influential position on the Davis Bend plantation. Davis wanted to establish a more positive working environment for slaves and encouraged education.

Following the end of the American Civil War, Isaiah began a business with his father. It lasted until Ben's death in 1877. His father had long dreamed of establishing an independent black colony; by the time of his death, the Reconstruction era had ended and African Americans struggled to maintain themselves against white supremacists.

Career
After his father's death in 1877, Isaiah Montgomery worked to realize his father's dream.  With his cousin Benjamin T. Green, he bought property in the northwest frontier of Mississippi Delta bottomlands to found Mound Bayou in 1887.  Bolivar County was the largest in area in the Delta. As farmers cleared land, they started cultivating cotton.

Montgomery worked to gain freedmen protection of the law, and to keep their work and lives separate from supervision by whites.

Montgomery attended Mississippi's 1890 constitutional convention as its only black or Republican delegate. Convened in Jackson in August, the convention drafted a new constitution which was designed to secure white domination of state politics, including the adoption of an "understanding clause" which required any prospective voter to be able to read and interpret any section of the state constitution. With little ability to challenge it, Montgomery accepted the clause, arguing that while it was "apparently one of unfriendliness" to blacks it was in the public interest to prevent illiterates from voting.

In what the Washington Post termed "A Notable Address Delivered by the Colored Statesman," Frederick Douglass gave a speech in October 1890 before the Bethel Literary and Historical Society of Washington, D.C.'s Metropolitan African Methodist Episcopal Church. He strongly condemned Montgomery's stance regarding suffrage in Mississippi. Douglass had spoken of Montgomery numerous times before and on the occasion cited his position as an act of "treason, to the cause of the colored people, not only of his own state, but of the United States," referring to the effect Montgomery's act would have in other states. He also lamented having heard in Montgomery "a groan of bitter anguish born of oppression and despair" and a voice of a "soul from which all hope had vanished."

Legacy
I. T. Montgomery Elementary School of the North Bolivar Consolidated School District (formerly the Mound Bayou School District) is named after Montgomery.

References

Works cited

External links
 

1847 births
1924 deaths
19th-century American businesspeople
African-American mayors in Mississippi
Mayors of places in Mississippi
Mississippi Republicans
People from Mound Bayou, Mississippi